Sonny Whitelaw (born 9 August 1956) is the author of several contemporary ecothriller and speculative fiction novels including five Stargate novels.

Whitelaw was born in Sydney, Australia and completed a degree in Geography and Anthropology at Sydney University; however, she abandoned a Master's thesis in Coastal Geomorphology in 1980 to work as a photojournalist and run dive charter yachts in the Republic of Vanuatu. She later founded The Adventure Centre, an adventure tourism company, and wrote the Vanuatu government's online encyclopedia. She obtained an MA from Queensland University of Technology in 2008 and Post Graduate Diploma in Sustainable Management in 2012 from Open Polytechnic New Zealand.

Whitelaw is a professional photographer and freelance photojournalist as well as author. Her work has appeared in several international magazines including National Geographic. The subject of climate change is central to much of her writing. She currently lives in the Canterbury foothills west of Christchurch New Zealand working as the manager of BRaid, an environmental trust.

Novels

Ark Ship: Science Fiction, December 2004
The Rhesus Factor: Eco-thriller, April 2005/ 2nd edition December 2013
Stargate SG-1 City of the Gods, April 2005
Chimera: Thriller, December 2005
Stargate Atlantis The Chosen, April 2006, co-authored with Elizabeth Christensen
Journeys of the Mind: June 2006 edited anthology includes short stories by Sean Williams author of three Star Wars novels and Marianne de Pierres
Stargate Atlantis Exogenesis, December 2006, co-authored with Elizabeth Christensen
Stargate SG-1: Roswell, April 2007, co-authored with Jennifer Fallon
Stargate Atlantis: Blood Ties, April 2007, co-authored with Elizabeth Christensen
Bone Menagerie: Urban fantasy, June 2013

References

External links
Official site
Stargate Novels
www.braid.org.nz

1956 births
Living people
21st-century Australian novelists
Australian women novelists
Queensland University of Technology alumni
21st-century Australian women writers